Douglas E. Koshland is a professor of molecular and cellular biology at the University of California, Berkeley.

Biography
Koshland is the son of Marian (née Elliot) and Daniel E. Koshland Jr. He earned his B.A. in Chemistry from Haverford College and his Ph.D. in microbiology from Massachusetts Institute of Technology under the guidance of David Botstein. He then did his postdoctoral work with Leland Hartwell at University of Washington and with Marc Kirschner at the University of California, San Francisco.

He was a staff scientist at Carnegie Institution for Science from 1987 and an adjunct professor in the Department of Biology at Johns Hopkins University. He was a Howard Hughes Medical Institute (HHMI) investigator from 1997-2012, was inducted into the National Academy of Sciences in 2010, and is a Fellow of the American Association for the Advancement of Science.

Personal life
Koshland is married to Mary Porter.

External links 
 His Academic Bio
His Howard Hughes Medical Institute bio
Lab website

References

Living people
American biochemists
Jewish American scientists
Howard Hughes Medical Investigators
People from Long Island
1953 births
University of California, Berkeley College of Letters and Science faculty
Scientists from the San Francisco Bay Area
Members of the United States National Academy of Sciences
Haas family
Haverford College alumni
Massachusetts Institute of Technology School of Science alumni
University of Washington alumni
University of California, San Francisco alumni
Fellows of the American Association for the Advancement of Science
Fellows of the American Academy of Microbiology